Janindu Inuwara (born 12 December 1999) is a Sri Lankan cricketer. He made his List A debut on 19 December 2019, for Panadura Sports Club in the 2019–20 Invitation Limited Over Tournament. He made his Twenty20 debut on 8 January 2020, for Panadura Sports Club in the 2019–20 SLC Twenty20 Tournament.

References

External links
 

1999 births
Living people
Sri Lankan cricketers
Panadura Sports Club cricketers
Place of birth missing (living people)